The Harbor Country News is a weekly newspaper published by News-Dispatch Media. It primarily serves the residents of, and their guests and other visitors to, the small communities of Harbor Country, a rural resort region bordering Lake Michigan in southwestern Berrien County, Michigan. 

Printed every Thursday, Harbor Country News bills itself as "southwestern Berrien County’s best source for local news, sports, entertainment, things to do, and great places to shop!" While the news and advertising offices are located in New Buffalo, Michigan, the paper is printed in nearby Michigan City, Indiana.

Harbor Country News is one of three weekly newspapers serving the inhabitants of Harbor County, the others being the New Buffalo Times and The South County Gazette.

External links
Harbor Country News web site

Newspapers published in Michigan
Berrien County, Michigan